Gerald Joshua Walker (born July 14, 1987), is an American rapper and singer from Chicago, Illinois. In 2018 he announced a partnership with Stalley's hip-hop collective Blue Collar Gang. Walker is known for his soul influenced style of hip-hop, and his associations with artist Layzie Bone of Bone Thugs-N-Harmony, Cardo, Yelawolf, Skyzoo and Rockie Fresh.

Musical career

1987–2010: Early life and career beginnings 
Gerald Walker was born in Chicago, Illinois and grew up in Bellwood and Matteson.  His father, a college professor and Air Force veteran was African-American, while his mother, an executive Assistant at the Proviso Leyden Council, in Maywood, Illinois, is of African-American descent. When he was five years old,  Walker's parents separated; this event would have a significant effect on Walker's personality and consequently his music. Walker attended Riverside University High School, and took classes at Columbia College Chicago during the summer.

It was the summer after his high school graduation that Walker first began rapping, inspired by hip-hop groups such as Little Brother and Bone Thugs-n-Harmony". He moved to Chicago to pursue a career in television while networking with other emerging artist within the city's music scene. In September 2009 Walker released his debut mixtape, "Evening Out With Your Girlfriend".

In 2010 Gerald Walker released his second official mixtape, I Remember When This All Meant Something.... The mixtape consist of fifteen original tracks including three hidden bonus songs featuring production from, Symbolyc One, producer of Kanye West's 2010 single Power.

Gerald Walker released his first Christmas-themed album, A Gerald Walker Christmas, which included three original and two traditional songs re-arranged with up-tempo beats in hip-hop-style.

2011–2012: Believers Never Die... 
In January 2011, Gerald Walker purchased a leased hip-hop instrumental from Dallas TX, based and Taylor Gang producer, Cardo. Walker then wrote, recorded and released the song entitled, "Here's Everything I've Always Meant to Say" as free download online. After pressure from Walker's friends he reluctantly emailed the finished song to Cardo, who, to his surprise, was impressed and the two began demoing songs for amusement. In April 2011, Walker announced that he would be touring with Shady/Interscope Recording artist Yelawolf. In May 2011, while on tour Walker released his third official mixtape, On Your Side, a collaboration effort with producer, Cardo.

In June, Gerald Walker was featured on MTV's RapFix Live broadcast, where he appeared with other mainstream and popular artist including Lloyd Banks, Maino and Jim Jones.  In September, Walker released his fourth mixtape The Other Half of Letting Go, in collaboration with popular street-wear brand Diamond Supply.  The mixtape quickly catapulted Walker as an emerging artist in the hip-hop community. Amber McKynzie of XXL Magazine wrote: "The mixtape might be titled The Other Half of Letting Go, but Gerald Walker is shaping up to be an artist that hip-hop shouldn't let go unnoticed." The mixtape was the only hip-hop release featured in the Shepherd Express "2011 Essential Albums of the Year" list.

In November, The Source debuted the track list and cover art to Gerald Walker's second Christmas album It's Christmastime Again, Gerald Walker. Originally slated as a re-release to his debut Christmas album he re-recorded and released seven original songs. That marked Gerald Walker's third release in 2011 – all within' a six-month time period.

2013–2017: Target 
In May 2013, after multiple hints and hashtags with the word Target via his Twitter Walker tweeted: "Everything's Done. New Chapter Begins. My debut album "Target" coming this Fall! Confirming his independent label debut's title.
On February 3, 2014, Gerald Walker announced The Target Practice Tour, a 16 date North American tour beginning on February 8, 2014, through the end of April 2014. The tour was accompanied by a mixtape release entitled, "Yesterday You Said Tomorrow (A Prelude to TARGET)". The release featured a collection of demo's that didn't make the final TARGET release.

In June 2015, Walker announced his book Target: 52 Weeks to Completing My Album, a memoir about his life featuring stories and anecdotes simultaneously released with the album. On June 5, 2015, Walker released the first single from Target titled "No Heart Feelings" featuring The Family. On August 25, 2015, the second single from Target titled "Follow Through" was released.  Target was also supported by two tours. The first being the TARGET Listening Sessions, a 10 date, 8 city album listening and concert tour. In May 2016 Walker embarked a 15 date international tour supporting the album titled the TARGET World Tour.

2018–present: Blue Collar Gang 
In July 2018, Walker in an interview with Billboard announced a music partnership with rapper Stalley's Blue Collar Gang imprint. On December 7, 2018, Walker released his third studio EP titled People Tell Themselves Anything to Justify Everything. In February 2019, ESPN's First Take featured Walker's "Time" single from People Tell Themselves Anything to Justify Everything as the show's theme song. On March 8, 2019, Walker released his fourth studio EP titled The Little Foxes, That Spoil The Vines.

On August 1, 2019, Walker debuted his single and music video " Win Streak" from his forthcoming EP "And Only a Few Ever Find It". In November 2019, Walker also embarked on Stalley's 'The Head Trip Tour', opening along with fellow label mates, LifeDutchee.

 Business ventures 
According to VIBE magazine in December 2019 Walker launched a new business venture, Ayọ Fragrance + Design Studios. The company focuses on unisex fragrances and scented candles.

 Discography 

 Studio albums 

 Books 
2016: TARGET Practice: 52 Weeks to Completing My Album Albums and mixtapes 
2010: I Remember When This All Meant Something...2010: A Gerald Walker Christmas EP2011: On Your Side2011: The Other Half of Letting Go2011: It's Christmastime Again, Gerald Walker2012: Believers Never Die2012: On Your Side Part Deux (2012)
2012: Gerald Walker Christmas Collection Vol. 1 (2012)
2014: "Yesterday You Said Tomorrow"
2015: Target2017: Target: Redux2018: People Tell Themselves Anything to Justify Everything2019: The Little Foxes, That Spoil The Vines2019: And Only a Few Ever Find It2020: The World Will Spin Without You2020: What Happened In Between... Magazines and features 
 URB (March 2008)
 Stuck Magazine (2007)
 Feed Me Cool Shit Magazine'' (2006)
 Annex Magazine (2013)
 Newsome WolfTracks newspaper (2013)

References

External links 
 From Da Bricks Magazine Interview

 
African-American male rappers
Midwest hip hop musicians
Columbia College Chicago alumni
1987 births
Living people
Songwriters from Illinois
Rappers from Chicago
People from Matteson, Illinois
People from Bellwood, Illinois
21st-century American rappers
21st-century American male musicians
African-American songwriters